The 1998 Artistic Gymnastics World Cup Final was held in Sabae, Japan in 1998. This edition marked the first time the World Cup Final was held. In 1997, the World Cup was revived, after a 7-year hiatus, as a series of qualifying events for a period of two years, culminating in a final event, the World Cup Final. The different stages, sometimes referred to as World Cup Qualifiers, mostly served the purpose of awarding points to individual gymnasts and groups according to their placements. These points would be added up over the two-year period to qualify a limited number of athletes to the biennial World Cup Final event.

Medal winners

References

1998
Artistic Gymnastics World Cup
International gymnastics competitions hosted by Japan
1998 in Japanese sport